The 1914 Virginia Orange and Blue football team represented the University of Virginia as a member of the South Atlantic Intercollegiate Athletic Association (SAIAA) during the 1914 college football season. Led by Joseph M. Wood in his first and only season as head coach, the Orange and Blue compiled an overall record of 8–1 with a mark of 3–0 in conference play, sharing the SAIAA title with Washington and Lee. Virginia outscored its opponents 353 to 38 on the season.

Schedule

Players

Varsity lettermen

Line

Backfield

Subs

References

Virginia
Virginia Cavaliers football seasons
South Atlantic Intercollegiate Athletic Association football champion seasons
Virginia Orange and Blue football